Scientific classification is a practice and science of categorization.

Scientific classification may also refer to:
 Chemical classification
 Mathematical classification, construction of subsets into a set
 Statistical classification, the mathematical problem of assigning a label to an object based on a set of its attributes or features

Biology
 Taxonomy (biology)
 Alpha taxonomy, the science of finding, describing and naming organisms
 Cladistics, a newer way of classifying organisms, based solely on phylogeny
 Linnaean taxonomy, the classic scientific classification system
 Virus classification, naming and sorting viruses

Astronomy
 Galaxy morphological classification
 Stellar classification

See also
 Categorization, general
 Classification of the sciences (Peirce)
 Linguistic typology
 Systematic name